Bradford Louryk is an American theater artist and actor. Louryk is best known for his solo performance work, which often incorporates gender reversal. He is also known for his unique taste in fashion.

Personal life 
Louryk was born in Scranton, Pennsylvania, and educated at Vassar College in Poughkeepsie, New York.

Praise 
Beginning in July 2005, Louryk garnered critical acclaim (including a half-page profile in The New York Times) for Christine Jorgensen Reveals, a recreation of a 1958 long-form recorded interview with Christine Jorgensen, one of the first American recipients of gender reassignment surgery, in which two performers lip-synch to the actual recording. Following its critically heralded New York premiere, Christine Jorgensen Reveals played to great acclaim in Edinburgh, Scotland, at the Festival Fringe; in Boston, Massachusetts, at the Boston Center for the Arts; and in Dublin, Ireland, at The Project Arts Centre.

In 2006, at the age of 28, Louryk was nominated for and awarded the Drama Desk Award in the category Unique Theatrical Experience. The production also received a "GLAAD Media Award" nomination for Best Off-Broadway Play in America, in addition to awards and nominations in Dublin and Boston.

Additionally, Louryk has historically received consistent praise for his portrayals of male characters.

References

Living people
American male actors
Vassar College alumni
Year of birth missing (living people)